Major-General Thomas Stanton Lambert  (1870/71 – 20 June 1921) was a British Army officer of the First World War era.  He joined the East Lancashire Regiment in 1891 and held a succession of regimental and staff positions in the pre-war period.  Lambert took part in the Retreat from Mons and afterwards commanded his regiment's 1st battalion at the First Battle of the Marne and the First Battle of the Aisne.  He later commanded the regiment's 2nd battalion and, temporarily, the 24th Infantry Brigade.  He was placed in command of the 69th Infantry Brigade in March 1916 and from May 1918 commanded the 32nd Division.  Lambert was mentioned in despatches five times for his work during the war and was appointed a companion of the Order of St Michael and St George and of the Order of the Bath.

Lambert retained command of the 32nd Division for a time after the war before reverting to brigade command.  He was posted to Ireland just before the Irish War of Independence to command the 13th Infantry Brigade.  On 20 June 1921 Lambert's car was ambushed by the Irish Republican Army, travelling from a tennis match with a fellow officer and their wives.  The party escaped but Lambert was wounded in the neck and died later that night.

Early life and career 
Thomas Stanton Lambert was brought up in Bradford-on-Avon, Wiltshire.  He was the son of the Reverend R. U. Lambert and attended Charterhouse School in Surrey until 1889. Lambert attended the Royal Military College, Sandhurst, and was commissioned as a second lieutenant in the East Lancashire Regiment on 17 June 1891.  Lambert was promoted to lieutenant on 18 October 1892 and to captain on  24 May 1900.  Lambert was married to Geraldine Rachel Lambert.  They had at least two sons: Edward Thomas Lambert, born on 19 June 1901 and William Harold Lambert, born 29 May 1905; both sons also attended Charterhouse.  Lambert made a donation to the Lord Mayor of London's fund for the relief of the Indian famine of 1899–1900.

Lambert served as adjutant of his regiment between 26 January 1902 and 23 December 1904.  He attended the Staff College, Camberley, from 23 January 1905 and returned to his regiment on 4 June 1907.  On 2 August 1907 he was appointed a staff officer and on 15 February 1911 became a deputy assistant adjutant general at the War Office.  Lambert was promoted to major on 13 September 1911 and returned to his regiment on 13 April 1914.

First World War 

After the First World War broke out in August 1914 Lambert served on the Western Front with the 1st battalion of his regiment.  He was present during the Great Retreat from Mons and took photographs of his men with a personal camera.  He commanded the battalion at the First Battle of the Marne and the First Battle of the Aisne in September.

Lambert was again appointed deputy assistant adjutant general on 9 April 1915, serving in that post until 14 June. He then returned to his regiment to command its second battalion.  Between 24 June and 16 July 1915 Lambert held temporary command of the 24th Brigade and was granted the temporary rank of lieutenant-colonel.  On 7 November 1915 Lambert was appointed an assistant adjutant general, serving in that role until 1 January 1916.

On 9 March 1916 Lambert was appointed to the temporary rank of brigadier-general and placed in command of the 69th Brigade.  He was promoted to the substantive rank of lieutenant-colonel on 28 May 1916 and to the brevet rank of colonel on 1 January 1917.  Lambert was appointed a Companion of the Order of St Michael and St George in the 1918 New Year Honours.  He was promoted to the temporary rank of major-general on 31 May 1918, when he was appointed to command the 32nd Division.  Lambert was appointed a Companion of the Order of the Bath "for valuable services rendered in connection with Military Operations in Italy" in the June 1918 Birthday Honours.  During the course of the war Lambert was mentioned in despatches five times.

Irish War of Independence 
Lambert had formally left the East Lancashire Regiment in January 1919, as he had been confirmed in his appointment to command the 32nd Division.  On 15 March he relinquished command of the division and became commander of a brigade, with the temporary rank of brigadier-general.  He relinquished command of the brigade on 25 September 1919, though he retained the temporary rank of brigadier-general.  He was promoted to the substantive rank of colonel on 13 October 1919 and the same month was granted command of the 13th Infantry Brigade which was stationed in Athlone, Ireland as part of the 5th Infantry Division.  Lambert's temporary rank became that of colonel-commandant on 1 January 1921 as the army transitioned away from brigadier-generals.

Assassination & Reprisals
In January 1919, the First Dáil, which was dominated by members of the Irish republican Sinn Fein political party, convened at Mansion House in Dublin and declared Ireland independent from both the United Kingdom and the British Empire. This resulted in what is now called the Irish War of Independence, which was fought from 1919 to 1922.

In early 1921, the First Dáil's  paramilitary wing, the Irish Republican Army (IRA), learned that Col.-Com. Lambert often travelled by motorcar to play tennis with other British Army officers at Midges House, near Coosan. Meanwhile, IRA Director of Intelligence and legendary guerilla warfare strategist Michael Collins had been determined to secure the release of Irish Volunteers General Seán Mac Eoin ever since the latter been captured by the British in March 1921. Collins knew that, if a British officer of the same rank were also captured, General Mac Eoin could be released as part of a prisoner exchange. For this reason, Lambert was selected for abduction and orders were accordingly dispatched to the IRA flying column based in Tubberclare, which was part of the Athlone Brigade.

Lambert's car was ambushed on the way back from a tennis match on 20 June 1921. There were five occupants: Lambert, Colonel Challoner and Kate Elsie Arthur, Challoner's niece in the back seats and Mrs. Lambert, who was driving, and Challoner's wife in the front seats. A party of 14 IRA men, commanded by Captain John J. Elliott, lay in wait near Moydrum with rifles, pistols and shotguns; Lambert's car approached around 7.30pm. Mrs. Lambert spotted the ambush and accelerated to break through it as no road block had been put in place. A warning shot was fired over the motorcar and, when it was ignored, it was followed by two more shots directed at the car's occupants. Col.-Com. Lambert was hit in the neck and Mrs Challoner slightly wounded, but the party escaped to safety.  Lambert died  at 9pm that night at the Church of Ireland Military Hospital in Athlone, he was 50 years old and was buried at the Brookwood Military Cemetery in Surrey, his grave is in the care of the Commonwealth War Graves Commission.

On 21 June 1921, a group of Black and Tans burned down many homes in Knockcroghery (see Burning of Knockcroghery), in reprisal for the attack on Colonel Commandant Lambert the day before. 
After the ambush the British carried out an intensive search for the responsible IRA men. The Black and Tans knew that most IRA members in the area were farmers and so focussed on farmhouses.  In the early hours of 2 July a group of masked men in "trench coats and tweed caps" burnt five farmhouses in Coosan district and one at Mount Temple in retaliation for the assassination of Col.-Com. Lambert. The following day the IRA retaliated by burning down Moydrum Castle, the home of Anglo-Irish landlord Albert Handcock, 5th Baron Castlemaine.

Lambert was posthumously granted permission to wear the insignia of a commander of the Italian Order of Saints Maurice and Lazarus on 2 March 1923.  He is remembered by a plaque in the Royal Memorial Chapel at Sandhurst.  His personal papers are held in the archives of the Imperial War Museums.

References

Further reading 
Records of inquest on Lambert's death

Deaths by firearm in Ireland
1921 deaths
Military personnel from Wiltshire
Burials at Brookwood Cemetery
British Army major generals
British Army generals of World War I
British military personnel killed in the Irish War of Independence
People from Bradford-on-Avon
Companions of the Order of the Bath
Companions of the Order of St Michael and St George
East Lancashire Regiment officers
Graduates of the Staff College, Camberley
Graduates of the Royal Military College, Sandhurst
People educated at Charterhouse School
1870s births